The Power is a 2021 British horror film written and directed by Corinna Faith and starring Rose Williams, Emma Rigby, Shakira Rahman, Charlie Carrick and Diveen Henry.

Plot 
In early 1970s London, a nurse in training spends her first night at the East London Royal Infirmary during power outages caused by a miners' strike.  In the near-total darkness of the old hospital, she is haunted by a supernatural presence, and by her own troubled past growing up in an orphanage.

Cast 
 Rose Williams as Val
 Emma Rigby as Babs
 Diveen Henry as Matron
 Charlie Carrick as Franklyn
 Shakira Rahman as Saba
 Gbemisola Ikumelo as Comfort
 Theo Barklem-Biggs as Neville

Release 
The Power was released on streaming service Shudder on April 8, 2021, in North America, the UK, Ireland, Australia and New Zealand.

Reception 
On review aggregator Rotten Tomatoes, the film holds an approval rating of 84% based on 55 reviews. The website's critics consensus reads: "A supernatural horror story grounded in real-world trauma, The Power marks writer-director Corinna Faith as an emerging talent to watch." Williams' performance in the film received praise. Simon Abrams for RogerEbert.com gave a mostly negative review, writing "Val needs to be more than just a generic symbol of right-minded martyrdom, and she’s never allowed to become more than that. The circumstances of her suffering are too slight to register, making it hard to feel anything for Val beyond a general sympathy."

References

External links
 

2021 films
2021 horror films
British horror films
Films set in hospitals
British supernatural horror films
2020s supernatural horror films
Films set in 1974
Films set in London
Films about nurses
2020s English-language films
2020s British films